Lycée français Victor-Hugo (LFVH), also known as Französische Schule Lycee Victor Hugo in German, is a French international school in Frankfurt am Main, Germany, which belongs to the AEFE network of schools. The school serves students from "maternelle" (kindergarten) up to the "lycée" (sixth form college/senior high school) level. The French school is located in the district of Praunheim, to the northwest of Frankfurt. Students are taught the French national curriculum and they can choose to prepare the Baccalauréat or the Abibac. The current head of the school is M. Nicolas Commenville.

History 

In 1949 the first classes were taught to French students living in Frankfurt. In the 1960s the initiative developed into a school with different classes, an official status and more than 150 students. With 550 students in 2000 the school opened at its current location in Praunheim. The primary school obtained Ersatzschule status in 2007 and the middle school in 2012. By 2014 enrollment had reached 1,000 students, divided into 48 classes.

About the school 

 The LFVH is a French school with an international recruitment: over 35 different nationalities are typically represented.
 The school moved to its current premises in 2000. The building was designed by architect Michel Regembal (also known for his contribution to the Stade de France).
 After being run by parents' associations for decades the school came under AEFE control in 2000.
 In 2007 the primary school obtained Ersatzschule status and so did the middle school in 2012.
 The German Staatliches Schulamt Frankfurt supervises the school's German component of the curriculum and the delivery of the Abitur.
 In September 2014 there were 1004 students registered in the school.
 LFVH is a whole-day school, including in the primary section.

Studying at the LFVH 

The French national curriculum is demanding and exhaustive. Like all French schools in France and abroad, LFVH adheres to it. 
 If parents and students choose the bilingual (French-German) track, this curriculum is supplemented by essential teachings which fit the German educational requirements. These students usually go on to sit the Abibac, a combination of the French and the German end-of-secondary-education diplomas, allowing them direct access to both French and German universities and colleges.
 The foreign languages students can learn at the LFVH: German, English, Spanish (as a first, second or third foreign language), and Latin.
 Extra-curricular activities include: chess club, sports club, arts club, drama club, music club, the Students' Council, and many others. Students participate in competitions in mathematics, language arts, sciences and sports in Germany, France and across Europe. Trips are organised on a regular basis to sites around Germany, Austria, France and the UK.
 A study time (Aide aux devoirs) is organised for middle school students who need support for their homework.
 Students with special needs also receive specific support.
 Students from the age of 3 can also attend Le P'tit Victor, the CEFA or l'Académie, all structures independent from the LFVH but which take care of LFVH students after class and offer all sorts of activities, including, for some, during the holiday.

See also
 La Gazette de Berlin
German international schools in France:
 Internationale Deutsche Schule Paris
 DFG / LFA Buc
 Deutsche Schule Toulouse

References

External links

  Lycée Français Victor Hugo
 Union des Parents et Amis du Lycée français Victor Hugo

French international schools in Germany
International schools in Hesse
Schools in Frankfurt